Old Pine Street Station, also known as the Old Western District Police Station House, is a historic police station located at Baltimore, Maryland, United States. It is a freestanding brick building of two stories raised on a partially exposed basement in the quintessential brick Victorian Gothic style.  It was constructed 1877–78.

The station was to be torn down to make way for a highway, but was saved through the efforts of preservationists and the demise of the highway project. The building is now used as a police station for the University of Maryland, Baltimore Police.

Old Pine Street Station was listed on the National Register of Historic Places in 1985.

References

External links
, including photo from 1991, at Maryland Historical Trust
Explore Baltimore Heritage - Pine Street Station

Buildings and structures in Baltimore
Government buildings on the National Register of Historic Places in Baltimore
Government buildings completed in 1878
Victorian architecture in Maryland
Police stations on the National Register of Historic Places
1878 establishments in Maryland